The 1944 All-Service football team is composed of American football players who were selected as by various organizations and writers as the best football players at their respective positions who were serving in the military and playing on military service football teams in 1944.

Ends
 Jack Russell, Randolph Field (AP-1)
 Nick Susoeff, Second Air Force (AP-1)
 Bolo Perdue, St. Mary's Pre-Flight (AP-2)
 Kenneth Whitney, Ft. Warren (AP-2)

Tackles
 Joe Stydahar, Fleet City NTS (AP-1)
 John Woudenberg, St. Mary's Pre-Flight (AP-1)
 Vic Schleich, Iowa Pre-Flight (AP-2)
 Donald Cohenour, Ft. Pierce (AP-2)

Guards
 Buster Ramsey, Bainbridge (AP-1)
 Russ Letlow, Camp Peary (AP-1)
 Harold Jungmichael, San Diego NTC (AP-2)
 Morris Klein, Great Lakes (AP-2)

Center
 George Strohmeyer, Iowa Pre-Flight (AP-1)
 Thomas Robertson, Randolph Field (AP-2)

Backs
 Otto Graham, North Carolina Pre-Flight (AP-1)
 Charley Trippi, Third Air Force (AP-1)
 Bill Dudley, Randolph Field (AP-1)
 Len Eshmont, Norman NAB (AP-1)
 Jack Jacobs, Fourth Air Force (AP-2)
 Charlie Justice, Bainbridge (AP-2)
 Glenn Dobbs, Second Air Force (AP-2)
 Bill Daley, Fort Pierce (AP-2)

Key
 AP = Associated Press

See also
 1944 College Football All-America Team

References

1944 college football season